Scaramouche, Op. 165, is a suite composed by Darius Milhaud. The suite is based on incidental music Milhaud wrote for two theatrical productions: Le Médecin volant and Bolivar. Scaramouche draws inspiration from various sources, with each of the suite's three movements being of a distinct character. Milhaud's characteristic use of polytonality can be heard throughout the piece.

Scaramouche was composed as a piano duo in 1937 at the request of Marguerite Long and was premiered at the Exposition internationale des arts et des techniques dans la vie moderne the same year. The suite was later arranged for various ensembles due to the piece's popularity, including arrangements for solo alto saxophone with orchestra and – at the request of the clarinettist Benny Goodman – solo clarinet with orchestra.

History

Inspiration 
The music in Scaramouche is taken from incidental music that Milhaud composed for two plays. The first and third movements are inspired by themes composed for Henri Pascar's production of an adaptation of Molière's Le Médecin volant (The Flying Doctor); it is from here that Scaramouche gets its name, as Pascar's group of players was named the Théatre Scaramouche. Movement two takes its theme from music Milhaud composed in 1936 for Jules Supervielle's opera Bolivar. Although he did not use any of the 1936 themes for final score, Milhaud later decided to repurpose the original overture for Scaramouche.

Composition and publishing 

In 1937, the French pianist Marguerite Long asked Milhaud to compose a piano duo for two of her students (Marcelle Meyer and Ida Jankelevitch) to play at the Exposition internationale des arts et des techniques dans la vie moderne. In response, Milhaud composed Scaramouche. Although it largely used music that Milhaud had composed previously, composing the suite did not come easy to him.

Scaramouche was published by Milhaud's friend, the printer Raymond Deiss, who requested to do so. Milhaud attempted to deter Deiss from publishing the suite, assuming that the music would not sell and prove a wasted investment — at the time printed sheet music was proving unpopular. Deiss refused to be dissuaded by Milhaud and proceeded to print the first edition.

Milhaud wrote about Scaramouche's publishing in his autobiography, Ma vie heureuse (My Happy Life):

Milhaud recorded that Diess took a special delight in telling him, "The Americans are asking for 500 copies and 1000 are being asked for elsewhere". After his immigration to America during World War II, Milhaud had Scaramouche republished in the United States.

Structure and music 

Scaramouche consists of three movements:
A full playing of the suite lasts approximately eight to nine minutes. Polytonality, a distinctive element of Milhaud's composing style, is used consistently throughout the suite.

Vif 
The first movement of Scaramouche has been likened to a cross between folk-song melodies and nursery rhymes: one of the themes used is the melody from the children's song Ten Green Bottles. Vif is written ternary (ABA) form. 

Polytonality can be heard as early as the opening measures, where chromatically clashing triads are layered under the movement's opening theme, which is in C major. The technique features again in measure 24, where a melody in the key of G major is played over an accompaniment in the original key of C.

Modéré 
The second movement hints at the French overture style, used by Johann Sebastian Bach and other Baroque composers. The movement has elements of canon and ostinato.

Brazileira 
Brazileira's tempo is marked as "Mouvement de samba". The movement is a samba choro inspired by Milhaud's prior time in Brazil: he had spent two years in Rio de Janeiro serving as secretary to the French ambassador Paul Claudel during the First World War. During this time, he listened to the music of Ernesto Nazareth, which served as an inspiration to the third movement. Brazileira is written in ABCA form.

Arrangements 

The original version of Scaramouche was written as a piano duo (Op.165b) in 1937. Due to the suite's popularity, Milhaud later arranged it for various different ensembles. A particularly successful arrangement was made for alto saxophone and orchestra/piano (Op.165c) in 1937 and was published in 1939 by Éditions Salabert. This arrangement was one of only two pieces that Milhaud wrote for saxophone and piano, the other being his 1954 composition Danse. 

On the request of the clarinettist Benny Goodman and his teacher Eric Simon, Milhaud arranged the piece for B clarinet and orchestra/piano (Op.165d, published 1941 by Éditions Salabert). In letters written between Milhaud and Goodman, Milhaud writes that the clarinet part was created by transposing the existing saxophone arrangement. He had refused Simon's suggestion of transposing orchestral parts, stating that it would be impossible to do without a complete rewrite of the piece. Goodman was said to prefer the arrangement of Scaramouche over Milhaud's more difficult Concerto for Clarinet, which was written specifically for him.

Other composers have arranged Scaramouche as well. Arrangements exist for wind band (Joseph Willcox Jenkins), violin and piano (Jascha Heifetz), saxophone and wind quintet (Don Stewart), guitar trio and a group of 12 saxophones.

Performances 
On 1 July 1937, Scaramouche was premiered at the Exposition internationale des arts et des techniques dans la vie moderne by French pianists Marcelle Meyer and Ida Jankelevitch.

A. Muhle premiered the arrangement for saxophone and orchestra in June 1940 with the Radio Paris Orchestra. The performance was later aired on Radio Paris. Op.165c was premiered in the United States in November 1940 by the Northern California WPA Symphony Orchestra. 

The arrangement for clarinet and orchestra was premiered in New York by Benny Goodman in 1941.

During the Nazi censorship of works by Jewish individuals, Scaramouche (along with Milhaud's other works) was banned. Undeterred by the censorship, Marcelle Meyer, alongside another pianist, organised a performance of Scaramouche on 1 June 1943 at the École Normale de Musique de Paris. To evade the ban on Milhaud's works, the performers were forced to attempt to trick the censors. The pianists used anagrams to provide a pseudonym for both Milhaud and the suite; they changed Darius Milhaud to become Hamid-al-Usurid while Scaramouche was changed to be Mous Are-chac. The performance managed to successfully take place, avoiding any censorship from the Nazi authorities.

Saxophonist Jess Gillam played the piece on the last night of the 2018 BBC Proms with the BBC Symphony Orchestra conducted by Sir Andrew Davis. Her performance was the first time the piece had been played at the Proms and was received well by audiences and critics. BBC reporter Mark Savage said it was "the indisputable highlight of the Last Night of the Proms", while The Telegraphs' Ivan Hewett called it "a sassy but also subtly moulded performance of Milhaud’s delightful Scaramouche".

Reception 
Audiences of the time received Scaramouche very well, which surprised Milhaud. The piece was a large success for Milhaud and continues to be one of his most popular works. Scaramouche has become a standard piece in both piano duo and classical saxophone repertoire; according to musicologist Paul Collaer, the suite "has earned itself an incomparably popular place in twentieth-century two-piano literature". In a 1970 interview, Milhaud stated that he considered Scaramouche to be one of his most successful pieces but said it was "a work that is not important". He believed that the suite did not deserve to be so popular as to the point of overshadowing some of his other compositions. The New York Times included Scaramouche on a 1974 list of "Milhaud's Major Works".

Recordings

Notes

References 

Compositions by Darius Milhaud
Suites (music)
Compositions for two pianos
Compositions for saxophone
Compositions for clarinet
1937 compositions
Modernist compositions